Giorgio Colli (1917 – 6 January 1979) was an Italian philosopher, philologist and historian. A native of Turin, he taught ancient philosophy at Pisa's university for thirty years; he edited and translated Aristotle's Organon and Kant's Critique of Pure Reason for Einaudi, a major publishing house in Italy. Subsequently, he produced the first complete edition of Nietzsche's work (including all the posthumous fragments chronologically ordered) together with his friend Mazzino Montinari. His work culminated in La Sapienza greca, an edition and translation of the "Presocratics" (a term he rejected). Interrupted by his death in January 1979, it was supposed to be in eleven volumes.

Bibliography 
Edited in Italian by Adelphi and in French by the Éditions de l'Éclat.
 Physis kryptesthai philei (Natura ama nascondersi), Milan 1948, IIe édition 1991; French transl. La Nature aime se cacher, 1994.
 Filosofia dell'espressione, Milan 1969; Fr.transl. Philosophie de l'expression, 1988.
 Dopo Nietzsche, Milan, 1974; Fr. transl. Après Nietzsche, 1987, IIe éd. 2000 [1]
 La nascita della filosofia, Milan, 1975; Fr. transl. Naissance de la philosophie, 2003 [2]
 La Sapienza greca, 3 vols. Milan 1977-1980; Fr. transl. La sagesse grecque, 1990-1992
 La ragione errabonda. Quaderni postumi, Milan 1982, Fr. transl. I. Philosophie de la distance; II Philosophie du contact; III Nietzsche, 1999-2000.
 Scritti su Nietzsche, Milan 1980, Fr. transl. Écrits sur Nietzsche', 1996
 Per una enciclopedia di autori classici, Milan 1983; Fr. transl. Pour une encyclopédie des auteurs classiques, 1990
 Gorgia e Parmenide. Adelphi, Milan, 2003
 Platone politico. Adelphi, Milan, 2007
 Filosofi sovrumani. Adelphi, Milan, 2009
 Apollineo e dionisiaco. Adelphi, Milan, 2010

 See also 
 Mazzino Montinari and the Will to power Further reading 
 Federica Montevecchi, Giorgio Colli. Biografia intellettuale'', Bollati Boringhieri, Torino, 2004

External links 
 Archivio Giorgio Colli  - 
  istitutocolli website  
 Editions de l'Eclat website 

1917 births
1979 deaths
Writers from Turin
Hellenists
Italian classical scholars
20th-century Italian philosophers
Italian philologists
20th-century Italian historians
Academic staff of the University of Pisa
Nietzsche scholars
Translators of Friedrich Nietzsche
20th-century philologists